The second season of Top Model aired on weekdays from October to December 2007, with a total of 41 episodes broadcast. Slovak-born model Adriana Karembeu hosted the competition, and the judging panel consisted of Dutch model and journalist Rosalie Afflelou, model scout and agency director Brice Compagnon and fashion designer Benjamin Galopin.

The international destinations for this season were London, Milan and Moscow. The winner of the competition was 17-year-old Karen Pillet from Maintenon.

Format changes
This season, the episodes will broadcast daily from Monday to Friday for 8 weeks, with 41 episodes broadcast. Each day, the members of the jury give the girls their personalized schedule. On the program: photoshoot, sports lessons with Gregory Bouchelaghem, theater lessons with Rodolphe Sand, dentist with Philippe Chpindel, makeover with Dany Sanz, Julia Fisher or Vincent McDoom, personal development course with Marine Méchin.

 On Mondays, the girls will have a challenge to find to is the best and the worst of the challenge.
 On Tuesdays, the girl who fails the challenge yesterday is challenged again, in a more embarrassing or humiliating way. The girl who has best succeeded in her challenge yesterday is rewarded.
 On Wednesday, the jury chooses three of the girls, and elects the "Top of the week", which gives her immune from elimination that week.
 On Thursday, the girls will have the photoshoot.
 On Friday, The best photo of each that the girls from yesterday photoshoot will be judged on the judging room. And that one of them could be eliminated.

Contestants
(ages stated are at start of contest)

Summaries

Call-out order

 The contestant was "Top of the week" and was immune from elimination
 The contestant was eliminated
 The contestant was quit
 The contestant was the original eliminee, but was saved
 The contestant won the competition

 In episode 4, Anna and Anne-Sophie quit the competition. They were replaced by Anaïs and Léa in episode 6.
 In episode 15, Léa was eliminated, but the judges decided to keep her in the competition.
 Episodes 21 and 38 featured double eliminations.
 Episode 31 ended on a cliffhanger, with the elimination being shown the following episode.

Judges
Adriana Karembeu
Rosalie Afflelou
Brice Compagnon
Benjamin Galopin

References

France